The Devil's Corner Cliff Walk is a feature of Ross Lake National Recreation Area.

Built in 1875, it functioned as pedestrian transportation until around the start of the 20th century, and now functions as a park. It was added to the National Register of Historic Places in 1974.

External links

https://web.archive.org/web/20110726160559/http://www.hpdb.org/historic_places/44587?tab=description
http://www.nationalregisterofhistoricplaces.com/WA/Whatcom/state.html

Parks in Washington (state)
Bridges on the National Register of Historic Places in Washington (state)
Buildings and structures in Skagit County, Washington
Geography of Whatcom County, Washington
National Register of Historic Places in Whatcom County, Washington
Pedestrian bridges in Washington (state)
National Register of Historic Places in Ross Lake National Recreation Area